Reverend Herbert Richard Peel (1831–1885) was an English clergyman. He played cricket for Oxford University and Kent County Cricket Club. He also worked to popularise apiculture.

Life
He was the son of John Peel (1798–1875), at the time of his birth a prebendary of Canterbury Cathedral then later Dean of Worcester, and his wife Augusta Swinfen (1794–1861); Robert Peel the prime minister of the United Kingdom, was his uncle. He was educated at Eton College, under Edward Craven Hawtrey as headmaster, and then spent two years as a private pupil of the Rev. Henry Drury, at Bremhill. He matriculated in 1849 at Christ Church, Oxford, where he graduated B.A, in 1853, and M.A. in 1856.

Peel became a priest in the Church of England, ordained in 1854 and initially a curate at Hallow, Worcestershire to 1855. He was then curate at Charlecote. In 1860 he was appointed by his father as rector of Handsworth, an industrial town then in Staffordshire. 
Retiring from the ministry in 1873, he spent two years travelling, in poor health with rheumatic fever.

In 1875 Peel's father died, and he went to live at Abbot's Hill in Hertfordshire. Soon afterwards he became involved with the British Bee-Keepers' Association. In 1882 he moved to Thornton Hall, Buckinghamshire.

Death
On 2 July 1885, Peel shot himself in Thornton Hall. His will, proved in London on 28 July, left a personal estate of £97,000 (worth over £9 million in 2015).

Cricket career
Peel's first-class cricket career was brief, of nine matches for Oxford University, Kent County Cricket Club and the Gentlemen of Kent in the 1851 and 1852 seasons. He played as a batsman, with a top score of 82. He played in non-first-class matches for a variety of teams, including the pre-county Worcestershire and Oxfordshire clubs, the Gentlemen of Worcestershire and I Zingari.

Family
On 6 September 1853 at Hartlebury in Worcestershire, Peel married Georgiana Maria Baker (1830–1907), only daughter of the Reverend Thomas Baker, rector of Hartlebury, and his wife Elizabeth, daughter of Bishop Robert James Carr. They had four children:

 Alice (1854–1942), who married Arthur Howard Heath, a keen cricketer and rugby international.
 Herbert (1856–1933), who married Muriel Hilda Miller.
 Amy (1859–1929), who married the Reverend James Henry Savory, another cricketer and FA Cup finalist footballer.
 Augusta (1862–1925), who married first William Wyckham Tyrwhitt-Drake and secondly Frederick Peter Game.

References

External links
 

1831 births
1885 deaths
People from Canterbury
English cricketers of 1826 to 1863
People educated at Eton College
Alumni of Christ Church, Oxford
Oxford University cricketers
Kent cricketers
English cricketers
19th-century English Anglican priests
Suicides by firearm in England
Cricketers from Handsworth, West Midlands
People from Aylesbury Vale
Gentlemen of Kent cricketers
1880s suicides